Kenneth Paul King (born December 28, 1971), is an American businessman and politician. He is a Republican member of the Texas House of Representatives from District 88 in the Texas Panhandle. King is a businessman engaged in the oil and natural gas industry.

Career

Politics 
On July 31, 2012, King defeated first-term incumbent Republican Jim Landtroop, an insurance agent from Plainview, in a runoff election. King received 7,541 votes (54 percent) to Landtroop's 6,426 ballots (46 percent). The runoff was required because of the unsuccessful candidacy of a third candidate, former State Representative Gary Walker.

King serves on the Judiciary & Civil Jurisprudence and Public Education committees. He was elected to his second term in office on November 4, 2014, with a margin of 91.2 percent over a Libertarian opponent.

In 2016, King was unopposed in both the primary and general elections.

Ratings
Empower Texans/Texans for Fiscal Responsibility gave King a rating of 56% in 2015 and 39% in 2013. The National Rifle Association gave King a score of 93% in 2016 and a score of 86% in 2012. In 2015 the American Conservative Union gave King a lifetime score of 60%. Additionally, the Young Conservatives of Texas gave King a score of 37% in 2015 and 50% in 2013.

Personal life 
King resides with his wife, Robin Renell King, in his native Canadian, Texas, the county seat of Hemphill County. The son of Willard L. and Paulette King, he is United Methodist.

References

1971 births
Living people
American businesspeople in the oil industry
Methodists from Texas
Republican Party members of the Texas House of Representatives
People from Canadian, Texas
School board members in Texas
21st-century American politicians